The Order of Merit is an order of knighthood of the Cameroon.

History 
It is regulated by the ordonnance N° 72/24 of 30 November 1972. It is one of the four orders of Cameroon:
 Order of Valour
 Order of Merit
 Order of Agricultural Merit
 Order of Sports Merit

Insignia
The ribbon of the order is yellow since 1972. It was made of red, yellow and green stripes earlier.

Grades
The Order of Merit is subdivided into four grades of merit :

 Grand Cordon
 Commander
 Officer
 Knight

Recipients
 Ulric Cross
 Cyprien Katsaris
 Henri Romans-Petit

Grand Cordons
 Françoise Foning
 Princess Margriet of the Netherlands
 Josip Broz Tito
 Pieter van Vollenhoven

References

External links

Merit (Cameroon), Order of
Merit (Cameroon), Order of
Orders of merit
Awards established in 1924